The Tamma is a river in Yakutia (Sakha Republic), Russia.

The Tamma is the largest river of Megino-Kangalassky District. The villages of Darkylakh and Khaptagay are located by the river.

Course  
The Tamma is a right tributary of the Lena. It is formed on the Sellyakait-Sella Ridge (Кряж Селлякаит-Селля), at the confluence of the Konyo-Daban and Ilin-Daban rivers in the Lena Plateau, between the Lena and the Amga. It heads in a roughly northwestern direction parallel to the Menda in its upper and middle course. It flows mostly across Megino-Kangalassky District but in one stretch it forms the border between this district and Khangalassky District. There are a few small lakes in the lower course of the river, part of the neighboring Lena floodplain. Finally it meets the Khaptagay arm of the Lena  from its source near the village of Khaptagay, south of Yakutsk.

The river freezes between October and May.

See also
List of rivers of Russia

References

External links 

Fishing & Tourism in Yakutia

Rivers of the Sakha Republic